Otto Georg Wetterstrand (14 September 1845 – 11 July 1907) was a Swedish physician and psychotherapist who was a native of Skövde.

Wetterstrand studied medicine at the University of Uppsala, and in 1871 received his medical license at Karolinska Institute. Later he maintained a psychiatric practice in Stockholm.

Wetterstrand was a highly regarded psychoanalyst whose influence spread beyond Sweden, and is credited as the first Swedish doctor to use suggestive psychotherapy.  Among his written works was Der Hypnotismus und dessen Anwendung in der praktischen Medicin, later translated into English and published as [https://archive.org/details/cu31924012163964 Hypnotism and its application to practical medicine'] (1897).

Wetterstrand was married to Agnes Cecilia Dahlbeck.

 References 

 This article is based on a translation of an equivalent article at the Swedish Wikipedia''.

Swedish psychologists
Swedish psychiatrists
People from Skövde Municipality
Uppsala University alumni
1845 births
1907 deaths